Kangenga is a town in Kenya's Central Province which is about 40 miles (64 kilometers) North-East of Nairobi, the country's capital city.

References 

Populated places in Central Province (Kenya)